Milne-Edwardsia is a genus of cnidarians belonging to the family Edwardsiidae.

Species:

Milne-Edwardsia andresi
Milne-Edwardsia carneata
Milne-Edwardsia fusca

References

Edwardsiidae
Hexacorallia genera